Yumaceras is an extinct genus of antelope-like palaeomerycid artiodactyl endemic to North America from the Miocene epoch, 13.6—5.33 Ma, existing for approximately .

Taxonomy
Yumaceras was named by Frick (1937). It was synonymized subjectively with Pediomeryx by Savage (1941) and Janis and Manning (1998); it was reranked as Pediomeryx (Yumaceras) by Webb (1983); it was synonymized subjectively with Cranioceras by Tedford et al. (1987). It was assigned to Pediomeryx by Webb (1983); and to Cranioceratini by Prothero and Liter (2007).

Fossil distribution
Norris Canyon, Contra Costa County, California
Cambridge Site, Frontier County, Nebraska
Haile V/XIXA, Alachua County, Florida

References 

Palaeomerycidae
Prehistoric cervoids
Miocene even-toed ungulates
Miocene mammals of North America
Prehistoric even-toed ungulate genera
Fossil taxa described in 1937